Donald Lehman (1933 – January 8, 1981) was an American man who was murdered in front of his family by four men in Arkansas. All four men: James William Holmes, Hoyt Franklin Clines, Michael Orndorff, and Darryl Richley, were convicted of capital murder and sentenced to death, albeit Orndorff's sentence was reduced to life without parole on appeal. The other three were all executed one by one on August 3, 1994. It was the first triple execution in the United States in the modern era.

Murder 
Donald Lehman, his wife, Virginia, and their daughter, Vicki, were at their home when four men wearing ski masks rang the doorbell and forced their way inside. Lehman was shot three times and severely beaten with a motorcycle drive chain in front of his family. More than $1,000 and several guns were stolen, according to court documents. Holmes, Richley, Clines, and Orndorff were arrested later that day. They were each convicted of capital murder and sentenced to death. Orndorff later had his sentence overturned on appeal, and Lehman's family agreed to a life sentence in his case.

Executions 
After the U.S. Supreme Court rejected arguments they were being treated like "hogs at a slaughter", Clines, Richley, and Holmes were all executed by lethal injection on August 3, 1994. All three of them declined to make final statements. Clines was executed first, and was pronounced dead at 7:11 p.m. Richley was pronounced dead 58 minutes later, followed by Holmes at 9:24 p.m.

See also 
 Capital punishment in Arkansas
 List of people executed in Arkansas

References 

1933 births
1981 deaths
1981 in Arkansas
1981 murders in the United States
Male murder victims
People murdered in Arkansas
Deaths by person in Arkansas